Elections to Liverpool City Council were due to be held on 2 November 1914.

Due to the First World War none of the seats were contested.

Annual local elections were suspended from 1915 to 1919. Under the Elections and Registration Act, 1915 the term of office of all members of the Council was extended by one year and casual vacancies among the members of the Council were filled by the choice of the Council, rather than by election. Subsequently, the Parliament and Local Elections Acts of 1916, 1917 and 1918 each further extended the term of office of all members of the Council by a year.

After the election, the composition of the council was:

Election result

Ward results

* - Retiring Councillor seeking re-election

Comparisons are made with the 1908 election results, as the retiring councillors were elected in that year.

Abercromby

Aigburth

Anfield

Breckfield

Brunswick

Castle Street

Dingle

Edge Hill

Everton

Exchange

Fairfield

Fazakerley

Garston

Granby

Great George

Kensington

Kirkdale

Low Hill

Netherfield

North Scotland

Old Swan

Prince's Park

Sandhills

St. Anne's

St. Domingo

St. Peter's

Sefton Park East

Sefton Park West

South Scotland

Vauxhall

Walton

Warbreck

Wavertree

Wavertree West

West Derby

Aldermanic Elections

Aldermanic Election 9 November 1914

The resignation of Alderman Sir Thomas Bland Royden Bart. (Conservative, elected as an alderman by the Council on 9 November 1913) was reported to the Council on 28 October 1914.

In his place, Councillor James Willcox Alsop (Conservative, Castle Street, elected 1 November 1912) was elected by the Council as an alderman on 9 November 1914

Aldermanic Elections 3 February 1915

Caused by the death of Alderman Edmond Brownbill (Liberal), elected by the Council as an alderman on 9 November 1910) on 12 December 1914

In his place, Councillor John Lamport Eills (Liberal, Great George, elected 2 November 1914) was elected by the Council as an alderman on 3 February 1915.

Caused by the death of Alderman William Radcliffe JP (Conservative), elected by the Council as an alderman on 9 November 1913) on 15 December 1914

In his place, Councillor William James Burgess (Conservative, Aigburth, elected 18 March 1913) was elected as an alderman by the Council on 3 February 1915.

Aldermanic Appointments

Aldermanic Appointments 9 November 1916

Caused by the death of Alderman Sir William Benjamin Bowring, Baronet (Liberal, elected by the Council as an alderman on 9 November 1910)
on 20 October 1916, which was reported to the Council on 25 October 1916

In his place Councillor William Evans JP (Liberal, Anfield, elected 1 November 1911) was appointed by the Council as an alderman on 9 November 1916

Following the resignation of Alderman Robert Edward Walkington Stephenson (Conservative, elected by the Council as an alderman on 9 November 1913) which was reported to the Council on 9 November 1916, Councillor Robert Stephen Porter (Conservative, Wavertree, elected 1 November 1913)
was appointed by the Council as an alderman on 3 January 1917 in his place

Aldermanic Appointment 6 June 1917

Caused by the resignation of Alderman Frank John Leslie
(Conservative, elected by the Council as an alderman on 8 January 1913) was reported to the Council on 2 May 1917. In his place Councillor Samuel Mason Hutchinson JP (Conservative, Kensington, elected by the Council as an alderman on 1 November 1913)
was appointed as an alderman by the Council on 6 June 1917

Aldermanic Appointment, 5 September 1917

The death, on 6 June 1917, of Alderman William Bartlett (Conservative, elected as an Alderman by the Council on 9 November 1910).

In his place Councillor Edward Russell-Taylor (Conservative, Anfield, elected 1 November 1913) was appointed by the Council as an alderman on 5 September 1917
.

Aldermanic Appointments 9 November 1917

The Resignation of Alderman Charles Herbert Giles (Conservative, elected as an alderman by the Council on 9 November 1910) was reported to the Council on 31 October 1916. In his place Councillor William Boote (Conservative, Low Hill, elected 1 November 1913) was appointed by the Council as an alderman on 9 November 1917
.

The Resignation of Alderman Richard Kelly (Conservative, elected as an alderman by the Council on 9 November 1913) was reported to the Council on 31 October 1916.

In his place Councillor George Brodrick Smith-Brodrick (Conservative, Fazakerley, elected 19 March 1913) was appointed by the Council as an alderman on 9 November 1917.

By-Elections

No. 6 St. Domingo, 4 November 1914

Caused by the death of Councillor Dr. Charles Alexander Hill (Conservative, St. Domingo, elected 1 November 1913) on 24 August 1914.

No. 15 Castle Street, November? 1914 

Caused by the election as an alderman by the Council of Councillor James Willcox Alsop (Conservative, Castle Street, elected 1 November 1912) on 9 November 1914, following the resignation of Alderman Sir Thomas Bland Royden Bart. (Conservative, elected as an alderman by the Council on 9 November 1913) which was reported to the Council on 28 October 1914

No. 17 Great George, 25 February 1915

Caused by the election by the Council of Councillor John Lamport Eills (Liberal, Great George, elected 2 November 1914) as an alderman on 3 February 1915, following the death of Alderman Edmond Brownbill (Liberal, elected by the Council as an alderman on 9 November 1910) on 12 December 1914
.

No. 36 Aigburth, 2 March 1915

Caused by Councillor William James Burgess (Conservative, Aigburth, elected 18 March 1913) being elected as an alderman by the Council on 3 February 1915, following the death of Alderman William Radcliffe JP (Conservative), elected by the Council as an alderman on 9 November 1913) on 15 December 1914

Appointment of Councillors

No. 18 Abercromby, 9 November 1915

Following the resignation of Councillor Edward Lawrence (Conservative, Abercromby, elected 1 November 1912), which was reported to the Council on 27 October 1915, his position was filled by Edwin Thompson, Manufacturing Chemist of 25 Sefton Drive, Liverpool, was appointed by the Council on 9 November 1915.

No. 37 Garston, 9 November 1915

Following the resignation of Councillor Joshua Burrow (Conservative, Garston, elected 1 November 1912), which was reported to the Council on 27 October 1915, Thomas Tushingham, Licensed Victualler of 31 Window Lane, Garston was appointed by the Council in his place on 8 November 1915.

No. 20 Dingle, 3 February 1916

Following the resignation of Councillor Thomas Charles Huxley 
(Conservative, Dingle, elected 1 November 1912), 
William Wallace Kelly, Theatre Proprietor of 3 Holly Bank Road,
Birkenhead, was appointed in his place by the Council on 3 February 1915
.

No. 18 Abercromby, 5 April 1916

Following the resignation of Councillor Charles Henry Hayhurst
(Conservative, Abercromby, elected 1 November 1911)
, 
which was reported to the Council on 1 March 1916
, Colonel Robert Montgomery, Corn Broker of 
8 Brunswick Street, Liverpool, was appointed in his place by the Council on 5 
April 1916
.

No. 20 Dingle, 5 April 1916

Following the resignation of Councillor Alfred James Branwood
(Conservative, Dingle, elected 1 November 1913), Joseph Dalton Wood, Coal Contractor of 8 Drury Buildings, 21 Water Street, Liverpool, was appointed in his place by the Council on 5 April 1916

No. 17 Great George, 4 October 1916

Following the resignation of Councillor Thomas Philip Maguire (Conservative, Great George, elected 27 November 1913), his place was taken by Thomas Owen Ruddin JP of Stapely House, Grassendale Park North, Aigburth
.

No. 34 Allerton, Childwall and Little Woolton, 4 October 1916

Following the resignation of Councillor Henry Glover
(Conservative, Allerton, Childwall and Little Woolton, elected 1 November 1913)
which was reported to the Council on 6 September 1916, Herbert Plant Harrison was appointed by the Council in his place on 4 October 1916
.

No. 29 Wavertree West

Caused by the death of Councillor Alfred Parsons (Conservative, Wavertree West, elected 1 November 1912) on 11 November 1916
.

John Glyn was appointed by the Council as a councillor, in his place, to represent the Wavertree West ward.

No. 26 Anfield, 6 December 1916

Caused by the appointment of Councillor William Evans JP (Liberal, Anfield, elected 1 November 1911) by the Council as an alderman on 9 November 1916 in order to fill the position vacated when Alderman Sir William Benjamin Bowring, Baronet (Liberal, elected by the Council as an alderman on 9 November 1910) died on 20 October 1916, which was reported to the Council on 25 October 1916.

Wilfred Bowring Stoddart JP of "Birkgate" Grassendale Park South, Aigburth 
was appointed by the Council as a Councillor to represent the Anfiels ward

No. 30 Wavertree, 7 February 1917

Following the appointment by the Council of Councillor Robert Stephen Porter (Conservative, Wavertree, elected 1 November 1913) as an alderman on 3 January 1917 following the resignation of Alderman Robert Edward Walkington Stephenson (Conservative, elected by the Council as an alderman on 9 November 1913) which was reported to the Council on 9 November 1916, Alfred Henry Bramley was appointed by the Council as a Councillor for the Wavertree ward on 7 February 1917

No. 12 Vauxhall, 2 May 1917

Following the death of Councillor Joseph Hughes 
(Irish Nationalist, Vauxhall, elected 1 November 1913) on 11 February 1917, which was reported to the Council on 7 March 1917, James O'Hare, Fancy Goods Merchant of 101 Richmond Row, Liverpool was appointed as a Councillor by the Council 
on 2 May 1917
.

No. 8 South Scotland, 2 May 1917

Following the death of Councillor Francis Joseph Harford JP
(Irish Nationalist, South Scotland, elected 1 November 1913) on 17 February 1917, which was reported to the Council on 7 March 1917
, in his place John Morley, Cashier and Book Keeper of 74 Dunluce Street, Walton, Liverpool was appointed by the Council as a Councillor for the South Scotland ward on 2 May 2017
.

No. 30 Wavertree, 2 May 1917

Following the death of Councillor Charles Clarke Morrison
(Liberal, Wavertree, elected 1 November 1911)

on 20 March 1917, which was reported to the Council on 4 April 1917
.  His position was taken by Robert Henry Morgan, Forwarding Agent of 3 Green Lane, Mossley Hill, who was appointed by the Council as a Councillor for the Wavertree ward on 2 May 1917
.

No. 9 Kensington, 4 July 1917

Caused by the resignation of Alderman Frank John Leslie
(Conservative, elected by the Council as an alderman on 8 January 1913) which was reported to the Council on 2 May 1917 and the subsequent election by the Council of Councillor Samuel Mason Hutchinson JP (Conservative, Kensington, elected on 1 November 1913) as an alderman by the Council on 6 June 1917.

On 4 July 1917, Joseph Ashworth, Builder and Contractor of 30 Holt Road, Liverpool was appointed by the Council as a Councillor for the Kensington ward

No. 26 Anfield, 3 October 1917

Caused by Councillor Edward Russell-Taylor (Conservative, Anfield, elected 1 November 1913) being elected by the Council as an alderman on 5 September 1917 following the death, on 6 June 1917, of Alderman William Bartlett (Conservative, elected as an Alderman by the Council on 9 November 1910).

John Greville Earle JP of 63 Upper Parliament Street, Liverpool was appointed as a Councillor for the Anfield ward on 3 October 1917.

No. 36 Aigburth, 9 November 1917

Caused by the death of Councillor William Parkfield Wethered 
(Conservative, Aigburth, 
elected 1 November 1913) on 17 October 1917
. In whose place, Commander John Howard Temple RNVR was appointed by the Council as a Councillor for the Aigburth ward on 9 November 1917.

No. 11 Low Hill, 5 December 1917

Caused by Councillor William Boote (Conservative, Low Hill, elected 1 November 1913) being appointed by the Council as an alderman on 9 November 1917, following the Resignation of Alderman Charles Herbert Giles (Conservative, elected as an alderman by the Council on 9 November 1910) was reported to the Council on 31 October 1916.

George Anthony Metcalfe, Billiard Table Manufacturer of 9 Holly Road, Fairfield, Liverpool, was appointed by the Council as a Councillor on 5 December 1917.

No. 11 Fazakerley, 2 January 1918

Caused by the Council appointing Councillor George Brodrick Smith-Brodrick (Conservative, Fazakerley, elected 19 March 1913) as an alderman on 9 November 1917, following the resignation of Alderman Richard Kelly (Conservative, elected as an alderman by the Council on 9 November 1913) which was reported to the Council on 31 October 1916.

In his place Albert Edward Jacob JP was appointed by the Council as a Councillor on 2 January 1918

No. 27 Walton, 4 April 1918

Caused by the death of Councillor Richard Pritchard (Conservative, Walton, elected 1 November 1912)  on 7 December 1915.

In his place Arthur Lloyd, Builder and Contractor of 46 Mandeville Street, was appointed by the Council as a Councillor on 4 April 1918

No. 28 West Derby, 4 April 1918

Caused by the death of Councillor William Henry Parkinson JP 
(Conservative, West Derby, elected 1 November 1912) on 12 February 1918

In his place John Ellis, Butcher of Town Row, West Derby, was appointed by the Council as a Councillor on 4 April 1918

No. 34 Allerton, Childwall and Little Woolton, 5 June 1918

Caused by the death of Councillor Herbert Plant Harrison (Conservative, Allerton, Childwall and Little Woolton, 
elected 4 October 1916), on 27 March 1917

In his place Frederick Harrison, Major in the Liverpool Scottish Regiment of Eton Bank, Hornby Lane, Wavertree was appointed by the Council as a Councillor on 5 June 1918

No. 15 Castle Street, 24 July 1918

Caused by the death of Councillor John Edward Rayner (Conservative, Allerton, Childwall and Little Woolton, 
elected 1 November 1913).

In his place Frederick William Frodsham JP, of Cross Mount, Aughton, Ormskirk was appointed by the Council as a Councillor on 24 July 1918

See also

 Liverpool City Council
 Liverpool Town Council elections 1835 - 1879
 Liverpool City Council elections 1880–present
 Mayors and Lord Mayors of Liverpool 1207 to present
 History of local government in England

References

1914
1914 English local elections
1910s in Liverpool